Thumby may refer to:

 Thumby (game console), a miniature video game console
 Thumby, Schleswig-Holstein, a municipality in Schleswig-Holstein, Germany